Berhanu Alemu Feysa (born 16 July 1982) is an Ethiopian former middle-distance runner specializing in the 800 metres. He competed at the 2000 and 2004 Summer Olympics failing to advance to the final.

His 800 metres personal best of 1:45.28 from 2004 is a former Ethiopian record, broken in 2011 by Mohammed Aman.

Competition record

Personal bests
800 metres – 1:45.28 (Bergen 2004)
1500 metres – 3:35.67 (Heusden-Zolder 2000)
One mile – 3:58.95 (Oslo 2002)

Indoor
800 metres – 1:45.85 (Fayetteville 2004)
1000 metres – 2:19.39 (Erfurt 2001)
1500 metres – 3:38.75 (Birmingham 2001)
One mile – 3:57.76 (New York 2007)

External links
IAAF profile
 

1982 births
Living people
Ethiopian male middle-distance runners
Olympic athletes of Ethiopia
Athletes (track and field) at the 2000 Summer Olympics
Athletes (track and field) at the 2004 Summer Olympics
Athletes (track and field) at the 1999 All-Africa Games
African Games competitors for Ethiopia
21st-century Ethiopian people